Nicholas Paul Mastromatteo (September 13, 1933 – June 16, 2018) was an American luger. He competed in the men's doubles event at the 1964 Winter Olympics.

References

External links
 

1933 births
2018 deaths
American male lugers
Olympic lugers of the United States
Lugers at the 1964 Winter Olympics
Sportspeople from Glen Cove, New York